The Mansfield Institute for Social Justice and Transformation is a social justice programming and transformational learning institute established in 1999.

The MISJT also hosts an on-campus student organization, MISO.

Social justice programming 

Past events include:
  One Book, One University lectures with Michelle Alexander, Jonathon Kozol, and Katha Pollitt.
 Mansfield Lecturers Marian Wright Edleman, Barbara Katz Rothman and Paul Rogat Loeb.
 Matthew Freeman Lecturers Anne Enke, Eric Klinenberg and Oscar A. Chacón.
 The Cradle to College Pipeline Summit which brought together academics, community organizers, legislators, criminal justice professionals and students to discuss the "cradle to prison pipeline."

Faculty and staff 
 Dr. Heather Dalmage, Director of the Mansfield Institute and Professor of Sociology.
 Nancy Michaels, M.A., Associate Director.
 Dr. Steven A. Meyers, Professor of Psychology and Mansfield Professor of Social Justice.

References 

Roosevelt University
Social justice organizations